Ismaila Sanyang is the current Agricultural Minister of the Republic of the Gambia. He was appointed 5 January 2016. He was promoted from deputy minister.

References

Government ministers of the Gambia
Living people
Year of birth missing (living people)
Place of birth missing (living people)
21st-century Gambian politicians